Apoctena orthropis is a species of moth of the family Tortricidae. It is found in New Zealand, where it is found on both the North and South islands.

References

Moths described in 1901
Epitymbiini
Moths of New Zealand